Miveh Rud (also Romanized as Mīveh Rūd and Miveh Rood; also known as Movārī, Muvāri, and Myuvari) is a village in Arzil Rural District, Kharvana District, Varzaqan County, East Azerbaijan Province, Iran. At the 2006 census, its population was 249, in 65 families.

References 

Towns and villages in Varzaqan County